Sydney George Checkland FRSE (9 October 1916 – 22 March 1986) was a British-Canadian economic historian.

Life

Born in Ottawa, Ontario, Checkland worked at the Bank of Nova Scotia, then the Ottawa Sanitary Laundry Company, while he gained associate membership of the Canadian Bankers' Association.  In 1938, he moved to England to study at the University of Birmingham, and in his final year served as President of the Guild of Students at the university.  In 1941, he was elected as President of the National Union of Students, serving for only one year before becoming President of the International Council of Students.

In late 1942, Checkland enrolled at the Royal Military College, Sandhurst, then was commissioned as a lieutenant into the Manchester Regiment, before becoming a tank commander in the Governor General's Foot Guards of the Canadian Army.  An injury during the Normandy landings at Falaise left him with permanent nerve damage.

After the war, Checkland joined the Common Wealth Party and stood unsuccessfully in Sheffield Ecclesall at the 1945 general election.  He then returned to study for a master's degree at Birmingham, after which he took up an academic post in economic science at the University of Liverpool, where he also obtained a doctorate.  In 1953, he transferred to the University of Cambridge, then in 1957 he accepted a personal chair at the University of Glasgow and founded the Department of Economic History.  He quickly developed a strong reputation in a range of fields relating to economic history, and continued to write until his death in 1986. He is credited with "being instrumental" in the establishment in 1976 of the Faculty of Social Sciences at the University of Glasgow "strong in the fields of business, banking, and urban history".

Sydney Checkland was elected as a Fellow of the British Academy in 1977, and as Fellow of the Royal Society of Edinburgh in 1981. He was a member of the Economic History Committee of the Social Science Research Council and then a Council member between 1970 and 1972. He was President of the Economic History Society between 1977 and 1980. Of his many scholarly publications, The Gladstones: a Family Biography, 1764-1851 (1971) won a Scottish Arts Council book award and Scottish Banking: a History, 1695-1973 (1975) won a Saltire Society prize. Checkland also served as a board member with the East Kilbride Development Corporation, 1964 to 1968.

During his career as a historian Checkland contributed to the development of archival records.  In Liverpool he collected the archives of merchant firms and initiated the University of Glasgow's collection of business records. He chaired of the Scottish Records Advisory Council, the National Register of Archives (Scotland) and was vice-president of the Business Archives Council of Scotland. Checkland's own papers are held by Glasgow University Archive Services.

Family

Checkland met Edith Olive Anthony in Birmingham and they married in 1942. Olive nursed Sydney back to health following his war injuries. Olive Checkland was an eminent scholar in her own right in the field of social history.

References

1916 births
1986 deaths
Academics of the University of Cambridge
Academics of the University of Glasgow
Academics of the University of Liverpool
Alumni of the University of Birmingham
Canadian emigrants to the United Kingdom
Common Wealth Party politicians
Economic historians
Presidents of the National Union of Students (United Kingdom)
People from Ottawa
Graduates of the Royal Military College, Sandhurst
Manchester Regiment officers
Canadian Army officers
20th-century British historians
Canadian military personnel of World War II
Fellows of the British Academy
British Army personnel of World War II
Governor General's Foot Guards
Common Wealth Party